Melissa Louise Kite (born 1972) is a British journalist, and current columnist for The Spectator. She has also written articles for several other newspapers, and was deputy political editor of The Sunday Telegraph until March 2011. She appeared as a panelist on 22 March 2012 edition of the BBC television programme Question Time which was broadcast from the coastal town of Grimsby in North East Lincolnshire.

Bibliography

References

External links
 

1972 births
Living people
British journalists
British writers
The Spectator people